Bergnäset is a locality situated in Luleå Municipality, Norrbotten County, Sweden with 3,648 inhabitants in 2010.

References

External links
 
Bergnäset at Luleå Municipality

Populated places in Luleå Municipality
Norrbotten